Angraecum scottianum is a species of orchid.

scottianum